Turanana cytis, the Persian odd-spot blue, is a butterfly of the family Lycaenidae. It was described by Hugo Theodor Christoph in 1877. It is found in Turkey, the Kopet-Dagh and Iran (the Alborz and Zagros Mountains).

The larvae feed on Acantholimon species.

References

External links
 Turanana cytis / İran Turanmavisi / Persian Odd-spot Blue. Butterflies of Turkey.

Butterflies described in 1877
Polyommatini
Butterflies of Asia